B. Braun is a German medical and pharmaceutical device company, which currently has more than 63,000 employees globally, and  offices and production facilities in more than 60 countries. Its headquarters are located in Melsungen, in central Germany. The company was founded in 1839 and is still owned by the Braun family.

B. Braun has more than 5.000 different healthcare products, of which 95% are manufactured by the company. In 2018, the company had a revenue of 6.908 Billion Euros.

History

The company originated in the year 1839 as a pharmacy in Melsungen, where it started to sell medical herbs by mail to customers in Germany.

Later, a manufacturing plant was built, where production of several medical products began, mainly surgical sutures. With this product, Braun started to supply to hospitals, and added in the following decades other product lines to its manufacturing program, like intravenous solutions, monitoring apparatus and other medical devices. In the 1960s Braun became highly specialised in plastics for pharmaceutical and medical uses, and developed the first plastic container for I. V. solutions in 1956, as well as many other products for patient care in hospitals.

As the company grew, manufacturing facilities were acquired or established in the United Kingdom, France, Italy, Spain, Switzerland, Hungary, Slovakia, Czech Republic, the United States, Brazil and Malaysia. B. Braun acquired Aesculap AG, a Germany-based manufacturer of surgical instruments. B. Braun and its subsidiaries employ more than 54,000 people in more than 60 countries as of 2014.

In 1969 the company introduced Lyodura.

Similar products from other manufacturers were removed from the market in the USA and Canada in 2002. In the same year, B. Braun Melsungen agreed with the Japanese health authorities to pay compensation to the families of the victims of over $ 600,000 each. 

In 2009 the company was named the best company in Germany to work for.

In February 2012, the company announced that it was no longer passing on human insulin. In the same year, B. Braun came into the market for genetic diagnostics with a participation in Tübinger Cegat GmbH. 

In 2013, B. Braun opened a day and seminar center in the Haydau monastery complex in Morschen.

In 2017, B. Braun and Philips entered into an alliance in the field of ultrasound-guided regional anesthesia. In 2018, B. Braun opened a new production facility for dialyzers in Wilsdruff, Saxony.

Divisions 

On an international level, B. Braun is separated into several divisions:
 Hospital Care Division, which handles products related to infusion and injection and other disposable hospital supplies.
 Aesculap Division, which handles products and services related to surgery.
 OPM (Out Patient Market) Division
 B. Braun Avitum Division which handles products and services related to extracorporeal blood treatment.
 TransCare, a home healthcare service operating in Germany, Austria, and the United Kingdom.
 B. Braun Sterilog, a service based in the United Kingdom for the cleaning, decontamination and sterilising of surgical instruments. Sterilog facilities are located in Pudsey, Yardley Green and King's Norton.

The United Kingdom headquarters are located in Chapeltown, just north of Sheffield, in South Yorkshire. The United States headquarters are located in Bethlehem, Pennsylvania, where the subsidiary company is known as B. Braun Medical, Inc. It sells pharmaceutical and medical products.

Aesculap 

B. Braun's Aesculap division, (/æsˈkliːp/), which includes Aesculap, Inc., its American unit, is a manufacturer of surgical equipment.  It derives its name from Aesculapius, the Greek and Roman god of medicine and physicians.  It manufactures a range of equipment including sutures, handheld surgical instruments, implants, and electrosurgical devices and powers systems.  It also provides training to healthcare workers through its Aesculap Academy.

Aesculap was founded in 1867 in Tuttlingen, Germany by Gottfried Jetter. During World War II, Aesculap manufactured and supplied needle tattoo stamps with which the Nazis marked inmates at Auschwitz concentration camp.

Aesculap, Inc., its American division, was founded in 1977 in Center Valley, Pennsylvania. Aesculap AG was incorporated into the B. Braun Group in 1998.

References

Companies based in Hesse
Pharmaceutical companies of Germany
Pharmaceutical companies established in 1839
Medical and health organisations based in Hesse